Steniolia eremica is a species of sand wasp in the family Crabronidae. It is found in Central America and North America.

References

Crabronidae
Articles created by Qbugbot
Insects described in 1964
Hymenoptera of North America